Katri Raik (born 26 October 1967) is an Estonian politician formerly representing the Social Democratic Party. She was sworn in as the Minister of the Interior in Jüri Ratas' cabinet on 26 November 2018, after Andres Anvelt resigned from the post. In 2019, she was elected to the Riigikogu. She was the rector of the Estonian Academy of Security Sciences before she joined the government.

In December 2020 she was elected as Social Democratic Mayor of Narva. After municipal elections she was again elected as mayor in December 2021 as leader of her own political list, the Katri Raik List.

References

External links

Living people
1967 births
Politicians from Tartu
21st-century Estonian politicians
Women government ministers of Estonia
Members of the Riigikogu, 2019–2023
Women members of the Riigikogu
Social Democratic Party (Estonia) politicians
Ministers of the Interior of Estonia
Recipients of the Order of the White Star, 3rd Class
University of Tartu alumni
Mayors of Narva
21st-century Estonian women politicians